Carlos Alberto Zanata Amato, better known as Zanata (born September 6, 1950), is a Brazilian former football defensive midfielder, who played for several Série A clubs.

Career
Born in São José do Rio Pardo, Zanata started his career in 1969, defending Flamengo. Before leaving the club in 1973, he won Placar's Bola de Prata (silver ball) award in 1970, won the Campeonato Carioca in 1972, and played 19 Série A games, and scored once. He joined Flamengo's rival Vasco in 1974, winning the Série A in 1974 and the Campeonato Carioca in 1977. Zanata played 120 Série A games and scored eight goals for the club. He played for Mexican club Monterrey from 1978 to 1980, retiring in 1981 while playing for Coritiba.

Honors
Flamengo
Campeonato Carioca: 1972

Vasco
Série A: 1974
Campeonato Carioca: 1977

References

1950 births
Living people
Brazilian footballers
Brazilian expatriate footballers
Campeonato Brasileiro Série A players
Liga MX players
CR Flamengo footballers
CR Vasco da Gama players
C.F. Monterrey players
Coritiba Foot Ball Club players
Expatriate footballers in Mexico
Expatriate football managers in Saudi Arabia
CR Vasco da Gama managers
Avaí FC managers
Al-Ahli Saudi FC managers
Association football midfielders
Brazilian football managers
Footballers from São Paulo (state)
People from São José do Rio Pardo